Kelly Anderson may refer to:

Kelly Anderson (cricketer), (born (1983) New Zealand cricketer
Kelly Anderson (tennis) (born 1985), South African former tennis player
Kelly Anderson (curler) in 1989 Scott Tournament of Hearts
Kelly Anderson (pageant contestant), Miss West Virginia